The Institute of Governmental Studies (IGS) is an interdisciplinary organized research unit at UC Berkeley, located in Moses Hall. It was founded in 1919 as the Bureau of Public Administration. IGS and its affiliated centers spearhead and promote research, programs, seminars and colloquia, training, educational activities and public service in the fields of politics and public policy, with a strong focus on national and California politics. Current IGS research focuses include institutional policy and design, political reform, term limits, campaign finance, redistricting, direct democracy, presidential and gubernatorial politics, representative government, the politics of race and ethnicity, immigration and globalization.

Faculty
IGS has an active interdisciplinary core faculty that draws from several schools and departments. In addition to political science, those disciplines include sociology, public policy, law, business, and history. The core faculty have published widely on many topics within the areas of institutional design, policy and politics. In addition, several of them have extensive experience working with governments, the media, and public commissions, adding a practical perspective to their work on institutional design and reform issues.

Programs and Centers within IGS
The Robert T. Matsui Center for Politics and Public Service  

Berkeley Center for Globalization and Information Technology 

Building Resilient Regions 

IGS Library

Cal-in-Sacramento Fellowship Program

Democracy Camp

John Gardner Public Service Fellowship Program

Research
IGS has demonstrated in recent years an ability to organize and fund path-breaking research in the areas of institutional design and reform. The Constitutional Revision and Blanket Primary projects drew together scholars from across the UC system and in several disciplines to analyze important contemporary institutional issues — for instance, how should the California Constitution be reformed? What impact has the change in primary rules had on the political system? In addition, IGS sponsors an extensive array of seminars on topics from game theory to political history, creating an intellectually stimulating environment that facilitates new advances in the social sciences.

Resources and facilities
Part of the IGS mission is facilitating and disseminating research. IGS has several resources that cannot be found anywhere else in the state that allow it to play this role. The IGS Library is a valuable and unique national collection of fugitive research materials. IGS Press is a small press publisher and has entered into more formal collaborations with the University of California Press and other campus social science units. The Institute publishes an occasional magazine called The Public Affairs Report and a new e-journal called the California Journal of Politics and Policy.

Public service
In addition to conferences and seminars, IGS provides valuable public service to the campus and state of California in various ways. The Institute regularly hosts visits by public officials to the campus and provides outreach to state government leaders. The Institute is the key campus resource for information about politics and public policy for members of the press and general public. The IGS Library answers thousands of public queries every year and recently launched a 2.0 website that has received much acclaim for its ability to break down state propositions in a clear and accessible manner.

IGS Directors
Samuel C. May: 1921-1955 

Milton Chernin (Acting Director): 1955-1958  

Dwight Waldo: 1958-1967 	

Eugene C. Lee: 1967-1988 

Nelson W. Polsby: 1988-1999 

Bruce E. Cain: 1999-2007 

Jack Citrin: 2007–present

References

External links

University of California, Berkeley
1919 establishments in California
Research institutes established in 1919